English rule in Wales refers to the period from the conquest of Wales by Edward I to the Laws in Wales Acts of Henry VIII, during which time Wales was ruled by the English in a colonial manner.

Wales was first invaded by the Kingdom of England, following England's own conquest by the Normans, in the 12th century and by the end of the 13th century, Wales had become a principality within the Realm of England. Owain Glyndŵr launched the Welsh Revolt against English rule in the early 15th century which managed to conquer much of Wales until his defeat to English forces. During the uprising, the Penal Laws against Wales were introduced by the English establishment to establish English dominance, and lasted until 1624.

Wales was formally absorbed into the Kingdom of England through the Laws in Wales Acts 1535-1542, and later the succeeding states of Great Britain and the United Kingdom.

History

Anglo-Norman invasion and colonisation 

The Battle of Hastings occurred in 1066, a pivotal point in the Norman conquest of England. By 1067 the Normans had begun building Chepstow castle and had begun an invasion of Wales. The Norman leaders spoke French and their English-speaking followers colonised conquered lands in Wales including south Pembrokeshire which has historically been referred to as "Little England Beyond Wales". Gerald of Wales tells a story of Henry II King of England, a successive Anglo-Norman king, who asked an old man of Pencader, Carmarthenshire, what he thought the outcome of the war would be, and his reply was:
"Never will it be destroyed by the wrath of man, unless the wrath of God be added... Nor do I think that any other nation than this of Wales, or any other tongue, whatever may hereafter come to pass, shall on the day of the great reckoning before the Most High Judge, answer for this corner of the earth."In response to Welsh advances, William established a series of earldoms in the borderlands, specifically at Chester, under Hugh d'Avranches; Shrewsbury, under Roger de Montgomerie; and Hereford, under William FitzOsbern.  He instilled a great deal of power into each earldom, allowing them control of the surrounding towns and land, rather than retaining it within the kingship. The inspiration for such an action seems to have been the overextended nature of the Norman troops, thus preventing William from exercising his own power in the area. It very well may have been implicit in the power granted the earldoms that they were to attack Wales, and, indeed, they did, beginning with south-east Wales, where many of the previous rebellions against England had begun. By the time of FitzOsbern's death in 1071, a castle had been established at a location known at the time as Striguil, near the mouth of the Wye.   This served as a base from which the Normans continued to expand westward into Wales, establishing a castle at Caerleon by 1086 and extinguishing the Welsh Kingdom of Gwent. However, the attacks in south-east Wales "faltered badly when [the earl of Hereford’s] son [Roger de Breteuil]... forfeited his estates for treason in 1075 and involved some of his vassals on the Welsh frontier in his downfall".

Following Henry's death in 1135, revolts once again broke out in parts of Wales. These revolts caused Norman retreat in many areas, most surprisingly in Deheubarth, where, according to R.R. Davies, "the Normans had made their most striking advances in the previous generation". A notable example was the Battle of Crug Mawr, near Cardigan, in which the Normans suffered a heavy defeat.

By the 1150s, Henry II of England lead his first expedition into Wales in 1157. He met with heavy and humiliating defeat, particularly at Coleshill / Coed Eulo, where Henry was entirely unsuccessful, almost being killed in the fighting. His army routed and fled.

King John achieved greater dominance over Wales and in 1211, he took the son of Llywelyn Fawr, Prince of North Wales, as hostage, and also forced the surrender of territory in north-east Wales. Llywelyn's son, Gruffydd ap Llywelyn, and other hostages were used as security by the king. However the Welsh and Scots joined English rebe Barons in forcing John to sign the Magna Carta of 1215. The document therefore holds specific Welsh provisions. These included The return of lands and liberties to Welshmen if those lands and liberties had been taken by English (and vice versa) without a law abiding judgement of their peers. Also the immediate return return of Gruffydd and the other Welsh hostages.

Conquest of Wales 

Following the uniting of Wales under the rule of the Llywelyn princes, Edward I King of England led 15,00 men to capture Wales following multiple failed attempts by English monarchs to maintain a grip on Wales prior to this. Resistance in Wales was led by the Prince of Wales Llywelyn ap Gruffydd (Llywelyn the Last) and he also made an attempt to recruit more Welsh soldiers in mid-Wales. Llywelyn was killed in the Battle of Orewin Bridge by English soldiers in an ambush trick under the guise of discussions. His head was paraded through London and placed on a Tower of London spike with a mocking crown of laurel leaves.

Llywelyn's brother Dafydd, took over leadership of Welsh fighters, but was caught in 1283. He was dragged through the streets of Shrewsbury by a horse, hanged, revived and disemboweled by English officials. His bowels were thrown into a fire as he watched. Finally, his head was cut off and placed on a Tower of London spike next to his brother Llywelyn, and his body cut into quarters.

Following the deaths of Llywelyn and Dafydd, Edward King of England sought to end Welsh independence and introduced the royal ordinance of the Statute of Rhuddlan in 1284. The statute was a constitutional change causing Wales to lose its de facto independence and formed the Principality of Wales within the "Realm of England". The name refers to Rhuddlan Castle in Denbighshire, where it was first promulgated on 19 March 1284. The statute confirmed the annexation of Wales and introduced English common law to Wales for criminal cases, while civil cases were still dealt with under the Welsh laws of Hywel Dda.

Rebellions

Madog ap Llywelyn 

Madog ap Llywelyn led a Welsh revolt of 1294–95 against English rule in Wales and was proclaimed "Prince of Wales".In 1294, he put himself at the head of a national revolt in response to the actions of new royal administrators in north and west Wales.
 
In December 1294 King Edward led an army into north Wales to quell the revolt, reaching Conwy Castle before Christmas. His campaign was timely, for several Welsh castles remained in serious danger. Edward himself was ambushed and retreated to Conwy Castle, losing his baggage train.  The town of Conwy was burnt down and Edward besieged until he was relieved by his navy in 1295.

The crucial battle occurred at the battle of Maes Moydog in Powys on 5 March 1295. The Welsh army successfully defended itself against an English cavalry charge. However, they suffered heavy losses, and many Welsh soldiers drowned trying to cross a swollen river. Madog barely escaped and was a fugitive until his capture by Ynyr Fychan of Nannau in Snowdonia in late July or early August 1295.

Llywelyn Bren 
Llywelyn Bren was a nobleman who led a 1316 revolt. Following an order to appear before king Edward II of England, Llywelyn raised an army of Welsh Glamorgan men which laid siege Caerphilly Castle. The rebellion spread throughout the south Wales valleys and other castles were attacked, but this uprising only lasted a few weeks. Hugh Despenser the Younger's unlawful execution of Llywelyn Bren helped to lead to the eventual overthrow of both Edward II and Hugh.

Owain Lawgoch 
In May 1372, in Paris, Owain Lawgoch announced that he intended to claim the throne of Wales. He set sail with money borrowed from Charles V, but was in Guernsey when a message arrived from Charles ordering him to go to Castile to seek ships to attack La Rochelle.

In 1377 there were reports that Owain was planning another expedition, this time with help from Castile. The alarmed English government sent a spy, the Scot John Lamb, to assassinate Owain. Lamb stabbed Owain to death in July 1378. 

With the assassination of Owain Lawgoch the senior line of the House of Aberffraw became extinct. As a result, the claim to the title 'Prince of Wales' fell to the other royal dynasties, of Deheubarth and Powys and heir Owain Glyndŵr.

Glyndŵr Rising 

The initial cause of Owain Glyndŵr's rebellion was likely the incursion of his land by Baron Grey of Ruthin and the late delivery of a letter requiring armed services of Glyndŵr by King Henry IV of England. Glyndŵr, pronounced Prince of Wales on 16 September 1400, proceeded to attack English towns with his armies in north-east Wales with guerilla tactics. The Tudor family, Glyndŵr's allies, captured Conwy Castle at Easter 1401 and in the same year Glyndŵr was victorious against English forces in Pumlumon. King Henry led several attempted invasions of Wales but with limited success. Bad weather and the guerilla tactics of Glyndŵr created a mythical status for him.

In 1404, Glyndŵr captured Aberystwyth and Harlech castles. He held a Senedd at Machynlleth, where he was crowned Prince of Wales and welcomed emissaries from Scotland, France, and Castille. French assistance arrived in 1405 and much of Wales was in Glyndŵr's control. In 1406 Glyndŵr wrote the Pennal Letter offering Welsh allegiance to the Avignon Pope and seeking recognition of the bishop of Saint David's as archbishop of Wales, and demands including that the "usurper" Henry Henry IV should be excommunicated. The French did not respond and the rebellion began to falter. Aberystwyth Castle was lost in 1408 and Harlech Castle in 1409 and Glyndŵr was forced to retreat to the Welsh mountains. It is likely that he died in 1416 at Kentchurch at the Anglo-Welsh border.

Penal Laws against Wales 

In 1401 and 1402, the Parliament of England passed a series of penal laws, that discriminated against the Welsh people. These laws were passed as coercive measures against the Welsh in response to the Welsh Revolt of Owain Glyndŵr. Penal laws banned Welsh people from holding a senior public office, public assembly, bearing arms, buying property in English towns. Penal laws also affected some rights of English men who married Welsh women. These laws remained in place long after the revolt, and were not obsoleted until the Laws in Wales Acts of 1532 and 1542 that were introduced by Henry VIII King of England.

Henry Tudor (Henry VII) 
Henry Tudor was born in Pembroke, raised in Raglan and his grandfather hailed from Anglesey. He played up these Welsh connections, relying on tales and prophecies of a native born Prince of Wales who would once again lead the Welsh people. He chose to fight under a banner of a red dragon at the battle of Bosworth Field. On taking the throne as Henry VII, he broke with the  convention that the Prince of Wales was named as the eldest son of the King, and declared himself Prince of Wales. During his reign he rewarded many of his Welsh supporters, and through a series of charters the principality and other areas saw the penal laws being abolished, although communities sometimes had to pay considerable sums for these charters. There also remained some doubt about their legal validity.

Integration with England 
Pressure from those within Wales and fears of a new rebellion led Henry VIII of England to introduce the Laws in Wales Acts 1535-1542 via the English parliament, legally integrating Wales and England. The Welsh marches were shired and the Principailty and Marches were reunited into the single territory of Wales with a clearly defined border for the first time. The Welsh legal system of Hywel Dda that had existed alongside the English system since the conquest by Edward I, was now fully replaced. The penal laws were obosoleted by acts that made the Welsh people citizens of the realm, and all the legal rights and privileges of the English were extended to the Welsh for the first time. These changes were widely welcomed by the Welsh people, although more controversial was the requirement that Welsh members elected to parliament must be able to speak English, and that English would be the language of the courts.

See also 

 Welsh rebellions against English rule
 Wars of Scottish Independence
 Irish War of Independence

Notes

References

Bibliography 

 
 
 
 
 
 
 
 
 
 
 
 
 
 
 
 
 
 
 

 
 
 
 
 
 

History of Wales
Principality of Wales